UBP-302 is a highly selective kainate receptor antagonist used in the study of many neurological processes. It is active at micromolar concentration within an in vitro preparation and specifically targets the GluK1 (iGluR5) subunit of the receptor. This compound was developed at the University of Bristol. 

UBP-310 and UBP-316 (ACET) are related N3-substituted willardiine derivatives.

References

Benzoic acids
Pyrimidines
Amino acids
Kainate receptor antagonists